Abu Musa Mombasa is a Pakistani member of the Somali militant paramilitary group al-Shabaab who serves as the group's chief of security and training operations.

References

Living people
Al-Shabaab (militant group) members
Pakistani expatriates in Somalia
Pakistani Islamists
Year of birth missing (living people)